Bickley Vale is a suburb of the Macarthur Region of Sydney in the state of New South Wales, Australia in Camden Council.

History
The area now known as Bickley Vale was originally home to the Gandangara people of the Southern Highlands although the Muringong, southernmost of the Darug people, were also known to inhabit the area. In 1805, wool pioneer John Macarthur was granted 5,000 acres (20 km2) at Cowpastures (now Camden). The name was taken from the name of a property located within the suburb. Bickley Vale is still primarily a rural locality.

Politics 
Bickley Vale lies in the south ward of Camden Council, currently represented by Chris Patterson (who is also the Mayor of Camden), Eva Campbell and Fred Whiteman. It sits within the state electorate of Camden, represented by Labor's Geoff Corrigan, the former Mayor of Camden, and the federal electorate of Macarthur, represented by Liberal's Pat Farmer, the former ultra-marathon runner.

References

External links
  [CC-By-SA]
  [CC-By-SA]

Suburbs of Sydney
Towns in the Macarthur (New South Wales)
Camden Council (New South Wales)